Ramya Subramanian, also known as VJ Ramya, is an Indian actress and television host, who has worked in the Tamil film industry.

Career 

Ramya participated in the Miss Chennai competition in 2004. She subsequently went on to host television shows, including Kalakkapovadhu Yaaru?, Ungalil Yaar Adutha Prabhudeva?, Namma Veetu Kalyanam and Kedi Boys Killadi Girls on Star Vijay. She revealed post-marriage, that she would cut down on television commitments and become more choosy with her work.

In 2007, Ramya made her acting debut with an uncredited role in Mozhi. In 2015, she appeared as Dulquer Salmaan's friend, Ananya, in Mani Ratnam's O Kadhal Kanmani. In the same year, she became an RJ at 92.7 Big FM. She was on the covers of WE Magazine's fitness special issue for the month of August 2019.

Personal life 
Ramya was born in Thanjavur. She completed her schooling in Padma Seshadri Bala Bhavan till 10th and continued her 11th and 12th in Adarsh Vidyalaya. She received a BSc in Visual Communication at M.O.P. Vaishnav College for Women, Chennai.

She married Aparjith Jayaraman in 2014, and the couple separated in 2015.

Filmography

Other work and activities 
Ramya is the author of the book Stop Weighting. She is running a YouTube channel named Stay Fit with Ramya.

Sports
Ramya participated in district and state level Powerlifting Championships and won gold medals. On January 2023, she participated in Chennai Marathon.

References

External links 

 

21st-century Indian actresses
Actresses from Chennai
Actresses in Tamil cinema
Indian film actresses
Indian VJs (media personalities)
Indian women television presenters
Living people
Television personalities from Tamil Nadu
Year of birth missing (living people)